The 1995 Southeast Asian Games, officially known as the 18th Southeast Asian Games, was a Southeast Asian multi-sport event held in Chiang Mai, Thailand from 9 to 17 December 1995. It was the first time that a non-capital city hosted the biennial sports event. Chiang Mai is the second Thai city to host the Southeast Asian Games after Bangkok. The games were opened and closed by Vajiralongkorn, the then-Crown Prince of Thailand. With the return of Cambodia, all ten members of the federation were present to compete in the SEA Games for the first time.

This was the fifth time that Thailand hosts the games. The country had previously staged the games in 1959, 1967, 1975, and 1985, all of which were held in Bangkok. Around 3,262 athletes from 10 participating nations participated at the games, which featured 28 sports.

The final medal tally was led by hosts Thailand, followed by Indonesia and the Philippines.

Organisation

Development and preparation
The Chiang Mai SEA Games Organising Committee (CMSOC) was formed to oversee the staging of the games.

Venues
The 18th Southeast Asian Games had 23 venues for the games, 19 in Chiang Mai, 3 in Chonburi and 1 in Lamphun.

Marketing

Logo

The logo of the 1995 Southeast Asian Games is an image of a Bo Sang umbrella which symbolises Chiang Mai as the host of the Southeast Asian Games. The image of the umbrella also resembles a running athlete, which represents the courage and determination of the games participating athletes and the participating athletes themselves. The colours of the umbrella blue, yellow, red, black and green are colours of the Olympic movement and represents the Olympic and sportsmanship spirit of the participating athletes. The 6-ring chain, the logo of the Southeast Asian Games Federation, represents the six founding nations of the Southeast Asian Games and the Southeast Asian Games itself.

Mascot
The mascot of the 1995 Southeast Asian Games is a Siamese cat named Sawasdee who takes a Bo Sang umbrella with him. The Siamese cat is one of the several varieties of cat native to Thailand. As a mascot, its name Sawasdee is a word often spoken in Thai as a greeting or farewell in Thailand. Its umbrella represents Chiang Mai province, Thailand, host of the 1995 Southeast Asian Games. One of its villages, the Bo Sang Village of Chiang Mai province, is famed throughout Thailand for the making of exquisitely hand made and painted umbrellas.

The games

Participating nations

 
 
 
 
 
 
 
 
  (Host)

Sports

Medal table

References

External links
 Medal Tally
 History of the SEA Games
 OCA SEA Games
 SEAGF Office  
 SEA Games previous medal table
 Medal Tally 1959-1995
 SEA Games members
 Official site

 
Southeast Asian Games
Southeast Asian Games
Southeast Asian Games
Southeast Asian Games in Thailand
Southeast Asian Games
Southeast Asian Games by year
Southeast Asian Games